Baltimore/Washington International Thurgood Marshall Airport , commonly referred to as Baltimore/Washington International Airport as well as BWI or BWI Marshall, is an international airport in the Eastern United States serving mainly Baltimore, Maryland and Washington, D.C. With Dulles International Airport and Ronald Reagan Washington National Airport, it is one of three major airports serving the Washington–Baltimore metropolitan area.

BWI Thurgood Marshall Airport, a base for Southwest Airlines, is the 22nd busiest airport in the United States and the busiest in the Washington–Baltimore metropolitan area. It is named after Thurgood Marshall, a Baltimore native, who was the first African American to serve as an Associate Justice on the U.S. Supreme Court. This airport also draws large numbers of travelers from the Harrisburg, Philadelphia, and Richmond metropolitan areas.

History

Early years
In 1944, the Baltimore Aviation Commission announced its decision that the best location to build a new airport would be on a  tract of land near Linthicum Heights. The cost of building the airport was estimated at $9 million. The site was chosen because it was a 15-minute drive from downtown Baltimore; close to the Pennsylvania Railroad line, the Baltimore and Annapolis Railroad line and the proposed Baltimore–Washington Parkway; and visibility was generally good. An alternate site along Gov. Ritchie Highway at Furnace Branch was rejected by the United States War Department, and another possible site at Lipin's Corner was deemed too far from Baltimore. The State Aviation Commission approved of the Linthicum Heights site in 1946.

Much of the land was purchased from Friendship Methodist Church in 1946, and ground was broken on May 2, 1947. Friendship Methodist Church held its last service on Easter Sunday in 1948. Friendship Methodist Church was razed to make room for the new airport. In addition, several pieces of land were bought, and 170 bodies buried in a cemetery were moved. Baltimore–Fort Meade Road was moved to the west to make way for the airport's construction.

Friendship International Airport was dedicated on June 24, 1950, by President Harry S. Truman. Truman arrived in the then official presidential plane Independence from nearby Washington National Airport carrying the Governor of Maryland, William Preston Lane Jr., as well as Baltimore Mayor Thomas D'Alesandro Jr. on his first aircraft flight. The total cost to construct the airport totaled $15 million. The following month the airlines moved to the new airport from the old Baltimore Municipal Airport (Harbor Field in southeast Baltimore at ). Eastern Airlines flew the first scheduled flight, a DC-3, into the airport at 12:01 am on July 23, 1950. Seven minutes later, the same plane was also the first flight to depart from the airport. 300 people came to watch the first flight arrive and depart.

The Official Airline Guide for April 1957 shows 52 weekday departures: 19 Eastern, 12 Capital, 8 American, 4 National, 3 TWA, 3 United, 2 Delta, and 1 Allegheny. Miami had a couple of nonstop flights, but westward nonstop flights did not reach beyond Ohio; Baltimore's reach expanded when jet service started. The early Boeing 707s and Douglas DC-8s could not use Washington National Airport and Dulles International Airport did not open until 1962, so Baltimore became Washington's jet airport in May–June 1959 when American and TWA began transcontinental 707 flights.

1970s–1990s

The Maryland Department of Transportation purchased Friendship International Airport from the City of Baltimore for $36 million in 1972. Under MDOT, the Maryland State Aviation Administration took over airfield operations and grew from three employees to more than 200. Plans to upgrade, improve, and modernize all Maryland airport facilities were announced almost immediately by the Secretary of Transportation, Harry Hughes.

To attract passengers from the Washington metropolitan area, particularly Montgomery and Prince George's counties, the airport was renamed Baltimore/Washington International Airport, effective November 16, 1973. Its IATA code, originally BAL, didn't reflect its new name for seven years until the International Air Transport Association assigned BWI to the airport on April 20, 1980, with the change becoming official six months later on October 26. The BWI code had previously been used by an airport in Bewani, Papua New Guinea.

The first phase of the airport's modernization was completed in 1974 at a cost of $30 million.

The terminal renovation program was complete in 1979, the most dramatic work of the airport's modernization, which was designed by DMJM along with Peterson & Brickbauer. The total cost was $70 million. To continue the work, the BWI Development Council was established to support initiatives for airport development.

The BWI Rail Station opened in 1980, providing a connection for passengers on the Northeast Corridor through Amtrak. BWI was the first airport in the U.S. with a dedicated intercity rail station. In particular, the station provided rail transit access to Washington, D.C., something that Dulles did not achieve until late 2022. In 1997 a new international terminal (Concourse E), designed by STV Group and William Nicholas Bodouva & Associates, was added, though Dulles continues to hold the lion's share of the region's international flights, and BWI has not attracted many long-haul international carriers. The first transatlantic nonstops were on World Airways about 1981; British Airways arrived at BWI a few years later. Aer Lingus, Air Jamaica, Air Aruba, Air Greenland, El Al, Icelandair, KLM, Air Canada, Ladeco, and Mexicana previously flew to BWI. Military flights, operated by the U.S. Air Force's Air Mobility Command, continue to have a significant presence at BWI.

Beginning in the 1980s and for much of the 1990s BWI was a hub for Piedmont Airlines and successor US Airways, but that airline's financial problems in the wake of the dot-com bust, the September 11 attacks, and low fare competition forced it to cut back. The airport has been a haven for low-cost flights in the Baltimore/Washington Metropolitan Area since Southwest Airlines' arrival in September 1993 and subsequent expansion in the early 2000s. Southwest is the airport's largest carrier, accounting for 56.12% of passengers carried in 2011. Southwest Airlines currently serves on average 245 daily departures to the US, Mexico and the Caribbean.

2000s–present

Ghana Airways began service to Accra in July 2000. The airline operated McDonnell Douglas DC-10s to Baltimore and sought to serve the many people of West African origin residing in the region. In July 2004, however, the US government prohibited Ghana Airways flights from taking off from or landing in the country. According to officials, the company was operating on an expired license and had disobeyed orders to stop flying an unsafe plane.

To accommodate Southwest's extensive presence at the airport, in 2005 Concourses A and B were expanded, renovated, and integrated with one another to house all of that airline's operations there for their major operating base. This new facility, designed by URS Corporation, opened on May 22, 2005. On October 1 of that year, the airport was renamed again, becoming "Baltimore/Washington International Thurgood Marshall Airport," to honor former US Supreme Court justice Thurgood Marshall, who grew up in Baltimore.

North American Airlines' introduction of a link to Accra via Banjul in June 2006 marked the return of direct flights between Baltimore and Africa. The carrier employed Boeing 767s on the route. Nevertheless, North American ended all scheduled service in May 2008. At the time, it flew nonstop to Accra and Lagos from Baltimore.

The airport has been a backdrop in numerous films, including The Silence of the Lambs, Goldfinger, Broadcast News, Home for the Holidays and Twelve Monkeys.

In late 2008 Health magazine named BWI the second healthiest airport in the United States. In 2009 the airport had a six percent increase in air travelers due to the proliferation of discount flights. In a 2009 survey of airport service quality by Airports Council International, BWI was the world's top ranking airport in the 15-to-25-million-passenger category. BWI also ranked seventh, in medium-sized airports, based on customer satisfaction conducted by J.D. Power and Associates.

On August 5, 2014, little-used runway 04-22 was permanently closed. The last operation on the runway was a Southwest Airlines flight from Chicago Midway that arrived at 4:18 AM.

In 2015, Norwegian Air Shuttle announced they would start flights from Baltimore to the islands of Guadelope and Martinique. In an interview with The Baltimore Sun, CEO Bjorn Kjos said "Baltimore is high on the list for long-haul destinations," hinting at further expansion into Europe. In mid-2018, however, the airline ceased all flights out of Baltimore due to heavy financial losses.

In early 2016 a partnership between the airport and Towson University's WTMD Radio Station announced a new concert series that will take place at the terminal's baggage claim on the lower level. The local bands of Wye Oak, Arboretum, and Super City. This new series follows the release event of Animal Collective's new album Painting With on November 25, 2015, where the new album was streamed throughout the airport.

In late 2018 construction began on a $60 million, five-gate expansion of terminal A for Southwest Airlines. The new expansion began operations in 2021. 2018 also marked a new annual record for passenger traffic at BWI Marshall Airport with over 27.1 million passengers.

In 2021, commuter airline Southern Airways Express ended its hub at BWI and switched its east coast hub to Washington Dulles International Airport. In addition, the airport's international growth continued with the addition of a twice-weekly flight by Air Senegal to Blaise Diagne International Airport in Dakar, Senegal via a stop in New York-JFK. However, in January 2023, Air Senegal ceased the New York to Baltimore portion of this route, dropping Baltimore back down to only two year-round transatlantic flights. In 2022, Play Airlines began daily nonstop flights from Baltimore to Reykjavík, Iceland, which was quickly followed a few weeks later by Icelandair also resuming flights from BWI to Reykjavík.

On January 26th, 2023, Copa Airlines announced they would start operating direct flights to Panama City, making them the first Central American airline to operate out of BWI. Flights are scheduled to start in June.

Facilities

Runways 
BWI Airport has three active runways:

 10/28: . Runway 28 is the main takeoff runway, unless wind conditions require takeoffs from Runway 15R. Runway 10 is equipped with ILS category IIIB, and runway 28 is equipped with ILS category I.
 15R/33L: : Runway 33L is the main landing runway, unless wind or fog conditions require landings on Runway 10 with its higher ILS rating. Thomas A. Dixon Aircraft Observation Area at Friendship Park overlooks Runway 33L. Equipped with ILS category I in both directions.
 15L/33R: . Main runway for general aviation and smaller commercial aircraft. Originally , it was extended in the 1990s and is able to handle emergency landings by Boeing 737 aircraft, by far the most popular plane at the airport. Equipped with ILS category I in both directions.
 Runway 4/22 (defunct): . Closed in 2014, this runway is now part of taxiways and aprons.

Terminal

Baltimore/Washington International Airport has five concourses with 78 gates. Of these, 14 are international (all 11 gates in Concourse E are international gates, four of E's gates are arrival-only, and three gates in Concourse D are also international gates).

Concourse A/B has 30 gates. Both are of exclusive use for Southwest.
Concourse C has 14 gates. Used by Southwest, American and Contour.
Concourse D has 23 gates. Used by all non-Southwest and American domestic flights, and Air Canada.
Concourse E has 11 gates. Used for all international flights; international flights from Southwest and Spirit arrive here.

Cargo concourse
The airport's cargo concourse covers a  area. Its facilities include a  cargo building in the Midfield Cargo Complex, including a 200,000 square feet warehouse used for Amazon Air, a foreign trade zone, a  air cargo ramp, and ramp parking for 17 aircraft with direct nose-in access for eight freighters.

Ground transportation

BWI is located at the southeast terminus of Interstate 195, a spur route providing connections to the Baltimore–Washington Parkway and Interstate 95.

BWI was ranked one of the "Top 10 Easiest U.S. Airports to Get to" by Aviation.com in 2007 and has a light rail station located just outside its main terminal.

Passenger van service to and from the Eastern Shore and Western Maryland is available through BayRunner Shuttle with services to and from BWI to Kent Island, Easton, Cambridge, Salisbury, Ocean Pines, and Ocean City (for the Eastern Shore) and Grantsville, Frostburg, Cumberland, Hancock, Hagerstown, and Frederick (for Western Maryland). There are also numerous private car, rental car, and cab services, as well as shuttles that go to and from BWI to local hotels; Baltimore and Washington and their suburbs; and Central and Western Maryland.

BWI Rail Station is located about a mile from the airport terminal; the free BWI Marshall Airport Shuttle connects the train station and airport terminals. The station is served by Amtrak Northeast Corridor trains, including the high-speed Acela Express, and the MARC Penn Line commuter rail service. Travel time by train is about twenty minutes to Baltimore's Penn Station and thirty-five minutes to Union Station in Washington, D.C. Trains depart at least once an hour seven days a week, with significantly higher numbers of departure times during rush hours.

In August 2014, BWI piloted a new bicycle-sharing system with the Boston-based company Zagster. Located adjacent to the light rail station, the bike sharing service connected terminal passengers to the nearby BWI Trail, as well as other local destinations. This service has been discontinued.

Other facilities

In 1985, the BWI Business District was established as a way to formalize businesses and hotels operating adjacent to the airport. The district comprises two smaller districts located to the north (West Nursery Hotel District) and west (Stoney Run District) of the airport. Numerous traveler resources and employment centers are located within both districts, such as the BWI Rail Station and BWI Rental Car Facility in the Stoney Run District, and the BWI Business District Light Rail Station, the NSA Friendship Annex, and dozens of hotel facilities in the West Nursery District.

A DHS facility is located in the lower level of the main terminal, near the international arrivals area / Concourse E Baggage Claim. This facility also includes a Global Entry Enrollment Center, as well as a TSA PreCheck enrollment facility.

In the early 1990s, BWI Airport opened the Thomas A. Dixon Aircraft Observation Area at Friendship Park. The observation plaza features a playground and a terrace overlooking the southern approach to the airport's 15R-33L runway. From this vantage point, several planes can be viewed simultaneously as they prepare for landing. The southern loop of the 13.3 mile BWI Trail travels through the park, providing cyclist and pedestrian access to the park.

In addition to the Thomas A. Dixon Aircraft Observation Area, which provides spotters with views of aircraft landing on runway 33L, spotters can use one of several parking garages to view arrivals to runway 15R, with some arrivals appearing to be below the spotter.

The Maryland Aviation Administration has its headquarters on the third floor of the terminal building.

Airlines and destinations

Passenger

Cargo

Statistics

Top destinations

Airline market share

Annual traffic

Accidents and incidents
 On February 22, 1974, Samuel Byck entered BWI, shot and killed an aviation police officer and stormed onto Delta Air Lines Flight 523. He killed the first officer and severely wounded the captain. He intended to hijack the plane and crash it into the White House. A gunfight ensued, and Byck was mortally wounded by a police officer from outside the aircraft. Byck killed himself before police stormed the aircraft.
The sole occupant, the pilot, was killed.
 On May 6, 2009, a World Airways DC-10-30 with registration N139WA operating as Flight 8535 from Leipzig, Germany for the Military Airlift Command experienced a hard landing at BWI. As a result of the captain's response to the hard landing, the plane's nose wheel struck the runway hard two times. The aircraft blew one of its front tires and had to execute a go-around before landing successfully. Several passengers were injured, including the first officer, who suffered back trauma. The age of the aircraft (29 years 11 months at the time of the accident) and the extent of damage to the front landing gear and fuselage resulted in the aircraft being written off. The aircraft was parted out and is now used on-site for fire/rescue training and practice purposes.
On December 17, 2020, Spirit Airlines Flight 696 skidded off the taxiway while turning a corner after landing due to icy conditions. There were no injuries or deaths among the 111 passengers and crew.

References

External links

 
 The BWI Business Partnership
 BWI Thurgood Marshall Airport topic articles and photos from The Baltimore Sun
 
 

Airports in Maryland
Airfields of the United States Army Air Forces in Maryland
Transportation buildings and structures in Anne Arundel County, Maryland
Airports established in 1950
1950 establishments in Maryland